John G. Richardson (June 29, 1957 – June 16, 2020) was an American politician and consultant from Maine. A Democrat, he served as Maine's Commissioner of Economic and Community Development and the Speaker of the Maine House of Representatives. Richardson unsuccessfully sought the Democratic nomination for Governor of Maine in 2010. In February 2018, the Portland Press Herald reported that Richardson was involved in a potential conflict of interest case regarding the University of Maine and a $100 million redevelopment plan for the nearby Old Town mill. On February 9, 2018 the Portland Press Herald reported that there weren't any conflict of interest issues involving UMaine or Richardson.

Background
Richardson was born in Washington, D.C. He received his bachelor's degree from University of Maryland in 1983 and his Juris Doctor degree from Creighton University School of Law in 1987. He practiced law in Brunswick, Maine.

Political career
In 2002, Richardson was elected House Majority Leader in the 121st Legislature, where he was the political spokesperson for the House Democratic caucus.

Richardson was elected the 97th Speaker of the House of Representatives in 2005. As Speaker, he successfully led efforts eliminate a $1 billion budget deficit and to balance the budget, brokered legislation to cut taxes, and reformed the Business Equipment Tax Reimbursement law.

Richardson also sponsored the legislation which created the Mid Coast Regional Redevelopment Authority(MRRA) and served on its planning and implementing committees.

In January 2007, he was appointed Commissioner of the Maine Department of Economic and Community Development, a position that he held until November 2009. He also served as a board member on the Finance Authority of Maine (FAME).

Committee assignments
Business and Economic Development  (Chair)
Banking and Insurance 
Rules and Business of the House (Ex Officio)

2010 gubernatorial bid and public appearances
 
On April 26, 2010, just six weeks prior to the Democratic primary, Richardson ended his run for Governor. He was denied failed public financing after the state ethics commission discovered hundreds of falsified or otherwise improperly collected $5 qualifying contributions which were required of candidates to obtain public funding.

Richardson was a political commentator on WCSH, Southern Maine' NBC affiliate. He also gave the political rebuttal to Governor Paul LePage's weekly radio address on WCME.

Death
Richardson died on June 16, 2020 at the age of 62, from an apparent heart attack.

Election history

References

1957 births
2020 deaths
Speakers of the Maine House of Representatives
Democratic Party members of the Maine House of Representatives
Majority leaders of the Maine House of Representatives
Politicians from Brunswick, Maine
Politicians from Washington, D.C.
University of Maryland, College Park alumni
Creighton University School of Law alumni
State cabinet secretaries of Maine
American political commentators
Maine lawyers